Robert Guy may refer to:

Robert Guy (Royal Navy officer)
Robert Guy (athlete) (born 1964), retired athlete from Trinidad and Tobago